Scopula decorata, the middle lace border, is a moth of the family Geometridae. It is found throughout Europe.

The moth flies in two generations from the end of May to August.

The larva feeds on thyme.

Subspecies
Scopula decorata decorata
Scopula decorata armeniaca (Thierry-Mieg, 1916)
Scopula decorata congruata (Zeller, 1847)
Scopula decorata drenowskii Sterneck, 1941
Scopula decorata eurhythma Prout, 1935
Scopula decorata przewalskii Viidaleppp, 1975

Scopula decorata congruata is treated as a full species by some authors.

References

External links
Middle lace border on UKmoths
Lepiforum.de
Vlindernet.nl 
Middle lace border from Portugal

decorata
Moths described in 1775
Moths of Europe
Taxa named by Michael Denis
Taxa named by Ignaz Schiffermüller